Port Salford is a proposed tram stop for Greater Manchester's Metrolink light rail system, which if established will serve passengers boarding and alighting at Port Salford.

The line has so far been constructed as far as  but this stop is not yet a committed scheme.

References
 Metrolink future network (archived version)

Proposed Manchester Metrolink tram stops